Joel Mascoll (born 26 October 1974) is a former Vincentian sprinter who competed in the men's 100m competition at the 1996 Summer Olympics. He recorded a 10.64, not enough to qualify for the next round past the heats. His personal best is 10.33, set in 1997. He was also on the Vincentian 4 × 100 m relay team, which placed 6th in its heat with a 40.54.

References

1974 births
Saint Vincent and the Grenadines male sprinters
Athletes (track and field) at the 1996 Summer Olympics
Olympic athletes of Saint Vincent and the Grenadines
Athletes (track and field) at the 1999 Pan American Games
Pan American Games competitors for Saint Vincent and the Grenadines
Living people